The Mansfield Training School and Hospital was a state school for people with developmental disabilities located in Mansfield, Connecticut, United States. It was active from 1860 to 1993.  Its former campus, located at the junction of Connecticut Route 32 and United States Route 44 in Mansfield is a  historic district that was listed on the National Register of Historic Places in 1987.

History
The hospital opened in Lakeville in 1860 as the Connecticut School for Imbeciles at Lakeville. Its name was changed to the Connecticut Training School for the Feebleminded at Lakeville in 1915. Two years later, it merged with the Connecticut Colony for Epileptics (founded at Mansfield in 1910) and acquired its present name.

When it opened in 1917, the merged institution had 402 students in residence. By 1932, the resident population had grown to 1,070. During the Depression and World War II, demand for its services increased, resulting in both overcrowding and long waiting lists for new enrollments. Staffing levels increased during the 1960s as philosophies on treatment of mental disability changed, and there were 1,609 residents and 875 full-time staff as of 1969. During the 1970s and 1980s many residents were relocated from dormitories to on-campus cottages or to group homes located around the state. By 1976 the resident population had dropped to 1,106, and by 1991 just 141 people remained as residents.

In 1993, after numerous lawsuits concerning the conditions of the hospital, Mansfield Training School was closed and its patients sent to outpatient facilities and other institutions. After the closure, some dilapidated buildings were demolished. Other buildings were split between the Bergin Correctional Institution and the University of Connecticut.

Historic district
The "Mansfield Training School and Hospital" was listed on the National Register of Historic Places in 1987. The majority of the contributing buildings were institutional buildings built between 1914 and 1930, all designed by the same architectural firm. Also, the district included a farm that was operated beginning in 1909. The farm supplied the institution with most of its food and provided occupational therapy for people with epilepsy, as farm labor was deemed to prevent epileptic seizures. Children housed in the
institution hand-molded the concrete blocks used to construct barns on the farm property.

The caretaker's residence was featured on the SyFy channel's ''Paranormal Witness'' on September 28, 2011 as a location of alleged paranormal activity.

See also
National Register of Historic Places listings in Tolland County, Connecticut

References

Hospital buildings completed in 1860
Government buildings completed in 1860
Mansfield, Connecticut
Psychiatric hospitals in Connecticut
Hospitals established in 1860
Defunct hospitals in Connecticut
Buildings and structures in Tolland County, Connecticut
Government buildings on the National Register of Historic Places in Connecticut
Greek Revival architecture in Connecticut
Victorian architecture in Connecticut
Historic districts in Tolland County, Connecticut
National Register of Historic Places in Tolland County, Connecticut
Historic districts on the National Register of Historic Places in Connecticut
Hospital buildings on the National Register of Historic Places in Connecticut
1860 establishments in Connecticut
University of Connecticut